Bob Krueger (1935-2022) was a U.S. Senator from Texas in 1993. Senator Krueger may also refer to:

Clifford Krueger (1918–1988), Wisconsin
Liz Krueger (fl. 2000s–2010s), New York State Senate

See also
Herman Kroeger (1831–1916), Wisconsin State Senate
Carl Kruger (born 1949), New York State Senate